The Uruguayan Athletics Confederation (CAU; Confederación Atlética del Uruguay) is the governing body for the sport of athletics in Uruguay. Current president is Lionel de Mello Estramil.  He was elected for the period 2011-2015 on June 20, 2011.

History 
CAU was founded on March 1, 1918, as Federación Atlética del Uruguay (Uruguayan Athletics Federation), and was later renamed to Confederación Atlética del Uruguay on May 23, 1938.  It was one of three founder members of the CONSUDATLE on May 24, 1918, in Buenos Aires, Argentina.

Affiliations 
CAU is the national member federation for Uruguay in the following international organisations:
World Athletics
Confederación Sudamericana de Atletismo (CONSUDATLE; South American Athletics Confederation)
Association of Panamerican Athletics (APA)
Asociación Iberoamericana de Atletismo (AIA; Ibero-American Athletics Association)
International Association of Ultrarunners (IAU)

Moreover, it is part of the following national organisations:
Uruguayan Olympic Committee (COU; Comité Olímpico Uruguayo)
Confederación Uruguaya de Deportes (CUD; Uruguayan Sports Confederation)

Members 
CAU comprises the departmental federations, regional associations, and clubs that practice the sport of athletics.

National records 
CAU maintains the Uruguayan records in athletics.

References

External links 
Official website (in Spanish)
CAU on Facebook (in Spanish)

Uruguay
Athletics
National governing bodies for athletics
Sports organizations established in 1918
Athletics in Uruguay